George Baldwin may refer to:

George Baldwin (diplomat) (1744–1826), British diplomat and mystical writer
George Pearce Baldwin (1789–1840), British foundryman
George Rumford Baldwin (1798–1888), American civil engineer
George Baldwin (Wisconsin politician) (1830–1907), Wisconsin politician
George C. Baldwin (1917–2010), American theoretical and experimental physicist and professor
George Colfax Baldwin (1817–1899), American Baptist clergyman 
George Baldwin (footballer) (1921–1976), English player of association football
George Baldwin (cricketer) (1878–1970), English cricketer
George Baldwin (American football) (1923–2013), American football player and coach

See also
George Baldwin Selden (1846–1922), American inventor